The enzyme cyclohexyl-isocyanide hydratase catalyzes the chemical reaction

N-cyclohexylformamide  cyclohexyl isocyanide + H2O

This enzyme belongs to the family of lyases, specifically the hydro-lyases, which cleave carbon-oxygen bonds.  The systematic name of this enzyme class is N-cyclohexylformamide hydro-lyase (cyclohexyl-isocyanide-forming). Other names in common use include isonitrile hydratase, and ''N''-cyclohexylformamide hydro-lyase.  This enzyme participates in caprolactam degradation.

References

 

EC 4.2.1
Enzymes of unknown structure